Alexis Nicolás Monserrat (born 8 September 1996) is an Argentine professional footballer who plays as a midfielder for Talleres RE.

Career
Tristán Suárez were Monserrat's first club, as he began featuring for them in Primera B Metropolitana from 2015. Twenty-six appearances came in the aforementioned campaign, sixteen of which were as a starter. He didn't appear in the 2016 Primera B Metropolitana, though returned in 2016–17 to play twenty-five times; all but one was a start. However, Monserrat played just one minute of senior football in the succeeding season, which led to his departure from Tristán Suárez in July 2018 to Almirante Brown. He made his debut during a defeat to Estudiantes in the third tier on 20 August.

Career statistics
.

References

External links

1996 births
Living people
Place of birth missing (living people)
Argentine footballers
Association football midfielders
Primera B Metropolitana players
CSyD Tristán Suárez footballers
Club Almirante Brown footballers
Argentino de Quilmes players
Club Almagro players
Talleres de Remedios de Escalada footballers